Salparovo (Salpar) is a rural locality (a village) in Taymurzinsky Selsoviet, Dyurtyulinsky District, Bashkortostan, Russia. The population was 85 as of 2010. There is 1 street.

Geography 
Salparovo is located 19 km south of Dyurtyuli (the district's administrative centre) by road. Taymurzino is the nearest rural locality.

References 

Rural localities in Dyurtyulinsky District